Scroggins Draw is a valley in Reeves County, Texas, United States that is in the Fort Davis 79734 ZIP Code.  The topicgraphical features are:
 Latitude:	31.0912495 North
 Longitude:	-104.0524129 West
 Elevation:	3963 Feet above MSL
  
The location is notable for being the intersection between Interstate 10 and the western terminus of Interstate 20.

References

Geography of Reeves County, Texas